Sivia is a town in central Peru, capital of the Sivia District in Huanta Province, Ayacucho Region. Both towns are in the zone known as the Valley of the Apurímac  and Ene River (Valle de los Ríos Apurímac y Ene, or VRAE). The VRAE is an area of such high childhood malnutrition and poverty that the government of Peru selected the VRAE to launch its National Strategy for Growth program in 2007. The VRAE is a major center of coca production.

References

Populated places in the Ayacucho Region